The 2022 Paradise Jam is an early-season men's and women's college basketball tournament. The tournament, which began in 2000, is part of the 2022–23 NCAA Division I men's basketball season and 2022–23 NCAA Division I women's basketball season. The tournament will be played at the Sports and Fitness Center in Saint Thomas, U.S. Virgin Islands.

Men's tournament

Bracket

Women's Tournament

Island Division

Reef Division

References 

Paradise Jam Tournament
Paradise Jam Tournament
Paradise Jam
Paradise Jam